Jura Falconis  is the student-edited law review of the Faculty of Law of the . It was founded by a group of students from the Law Faculty of the  who, in 1964, conceived the idea of producing their own law journal grafted on the famous American law reviews.

Every year, Jura Falconis organizes the Jura Falconis , an award for the best legal dissertation. Students at Flemish faculties of law submit their dissertations, which are judged by a panel of professors of law, including a judge of the Belgian Court of Cassation.

References

External links
 

Law journals edited by students
KU Leuven
Law of Belgium
1964 establishments in Belgium
Publications established in 1964